The 1985–86 NBA season was the Cavaliers' 16th season in the NBA.

The season saw the team draft Charles Oakley and John "Hot Rod" Williams with the 9th and 45th picks in the 1985 NBA draft, respectively. Oakley's draft rights were traded to the Chicago Bulls. Williams played in the United States Basketball League during the 1986 season, as he was unable to play in the NBA due to a trial in which he was charged for sports bribery and conspiracy. However, Williams would later spend nine seasons with the Cavaliers franchise starting in the 1986–87 season.

The Cavaliers finished the season with a 29–53 record, missing the playoffs.

NBA Draft

Roster

Regular season

Notes
z - clinched division title
y - clinched division title
x - clinched playoff spot

Record vs. opponents

Regular season

Game log

|-style="background:#fcc;"
| 1 || October 25, 1985 || @ Chicago
|-style="background:#fcc;"
| 2 || October 26, 1985 || Boston

|-style="background:#cfc;"
| 11 || November 16, 1985 || @ Chicago
|-style="background:#fcc;"
| 12 || November 19, 1985 || Golden State
|-style="background:#cfc;"
| 15 || November 24, 1985 || Atlanta
| W 98–90
|
|
|
| Coliseum at Richfield6,145
| 6–9
|-style="background:#fcc;"
| 16 || November 26, 1985 || @ Detroit

|-style="background:#cfc;"
| 20 || December 7, 1985 || Denver
|-style="background:#fcc;"
| 21 || December 10, 1985 || Detroit
|-style="background:#cfc;"
| 24 || December 14, 1985 || Boston
|-style="background:#fcc;"
| 25 || December 17, 1985 || Houston
|-style="background:#cfc;"
| 28 || December 22, 1985 || Dallas
|-style="background:#cfc;"
| 30 || December 27, 1985 || @ Detroit
|-style="background:#fcc;"
| 32 || December 30, 1985 || Chicago

|-style="background:#fcc;"
| 36 || January 8, 1986 || @ Boston
|-style="background:#fcc;"
| 39 || January 16, 1986 || @ Atlanta
| L 99–116
|
|
|
| The Omni4,961
| 16–23
|-style="background:#fcc;"
| 42 || January 22, 1986 || Detroit
|-style="background:#fcc;"
| 44 || January 27, 1986 || @ Denver
|-style="background:#fcc;"
| 45 || January 28, 1986 || @ Houston
|-style="background:#fcc;"
| 47 || January 31, 1986 || @ Dallas

|-style="background:#fcc;"
| 48 || February 4, 1986 || Atlanta
| L 104–105
|
|
|
| Coliseum at Richfield6,702
| 18–30
|-style="background:#fcc;"
| 55 || February 20, 1986 || Detroit
|-style="background:#fcc;"
| 58 || February 26, 1986 || @ Atlanta
| L 109–129
|
|
|
| The Omni6,504
| 23–35
|-style="background:#fcc;"
| 59 || February 28, 1986 || @ Chicago

|-style="background:#fcc;"
| 63 || March 8, 1986 || @ Golden State
|-style="background:#fcc;"
| 69 || March 18, 1986 || vs. Boston(at Hartford, CT)
|-style="background:#cfc;"
| 71 || March 22, 1986 || Chicago
|-style="background:#fcc;"
| 72 || March 25, 1986 || Atlanta
| L 91–97
|
|
|
| Coliseum at Richfield7,178
| 26–46
|-style="background:#cfc;"
| 74 || March 29, 1986 || @ Atlanta
| W 123–105
|
|
|
| The Omni9,056
| 28–46

|-style="background:#fcc;"
| 75 || April 1, 1986 || Boston
|-style="background:#fcc;"
| 79 || April 7, 1986 || @ Detroit
|-style="background:#fcc;"
| 81 || April 11, 1986 || @ Boston
|-style="background:#cfc;"
| 82 || April 13, 1986 || Chicago

Player stats

Player Statistics Citation:

Transactions

Trades

Free agents

References

Cleveland Cavaliers seasons
Cle
Cleveland
Cleveland